Bernard "Bunny" Brunel is a French-American bass guitarist who has played with Chick Corea, Herbie Hancock, and Wayne Shorter. He is a founding member of the jazz fusion band CAB and is involved in musical instrument design and film and television scoring.
He was a bass and music teacher for jazz bass player Kyle Eastwood.

Discography

As leader
 Touch (Warner Bros., 1979)
 Ivanhoe (Inner City, 1982)
 Momentum (America, 1989)
 Dedication (Musidisc, 1992)
 For You to Play (Media 7, 1994)
 Bunny Brunel's L.A. Zoo (Tone Center, 1998)
 Led Boots (Mascot, 2000)
 Cafe Au Lait (Brunel Music, 2004)
 Touch (Nikaia, 2006)
 Invent Your Future (Nikaia, 2015)

With CAB
 CAB (Tone Center, 2000)
 CAB 2 (Tone Center, 2000)
 Live (2002)
 CAB 4 (Favored Nations, 2003)
 Theatre de Marionnettes (2009)
 Live On Sunset (Nikaia, 2011)

Singles
 Fusion Holidays, CAB, featuring Roman Miroshnichenko, (Nikaia, 2022).

As sideman
With Allen Vizzutti
 Allen Vizzutti (Headfirst, 1981)
 Skyrocket (Overseas, 1981)
 Olympic Jazz Series (Domo, 1999)

With others
 Jan Akkerman, Jan Akkerman 3 (Atlantic, 1979)
 Sandeep Chowta, Matters of the Heart (Sony 2013)
 Chick Corea, Secret Agent (1978)
 Chick Corea, Tap Step (Warner Bros., 1980)
 Christine Delaroche, Au Feminin (Eurodisc, 1978)
 Osamu Kitajima, Dragon King (Arista, 1981)
 Didier Lockwood, Lockwood (1975)
 Kathi McDonald, Above & Beyond (Merrimack, 1999)
 Gayle Moran, I Loved You Then...I Love You Now (Warner Bros., 1979)
 Georges Moustaki, Live (Polydor, 1975)
 Georges Moustaki, Olympia (Polydor, 1978)
 Claude Nougaro, Pacifique (WEA, 1998)
 Michel Polnareff,  Ze Tour (Enough/Universal 2007)
 Kazumi Watanabe, Kilowatt (Gramavision, 1989)

References

External links 
 Official site
 Discussion with Bunny Brunel

1950 births
Living people
People from Nice
20th-century American bass guitarists
20th-century American male musicians
20th-century French musicians
21st-century American bass guitarists
21st-century American male musicians
21st-century French musicians
American jazz bass guitarists
American male bass guitarists
American male jazz musicians
CAB (band) members
French emigrants to the United States
French jazz bass guitarists
French male guitarists
The Tony Williams Lifetime members